The Communist Party of Nepal is a political party in Nepal led by Netra Bikram Chand (Biplab). It was formed from a split in the Communist Party of Nepal (Revolutionary Maoist) in 2014.

History 

Echoing the 2012 split of Kiran's faction going by the name Communist Party of Nepal (Revolutionary Maoist), Netra Bikram Chand's faction split from it and claimed: "The Maoist revolt had grossly perverted by the time it arrived in Kathmandu from Rolpa. It is not possible to unite with the party that has strayed from the Maoist ideology." Biplab's party has its core strength in the western parts of the country, especially the remote Far-Western Development Region, which gets regularly cut off from the rest of the nation due to monsoon and snowfall for months on end, and therefore is at particular risk for famines and malnutrition.

Border dispute protest
Despite support for anti-India efforts during the impasse, the Kathmandu's government and Chand's party have come to loggersheads as Biplab's party has been marginalized from media, additionally having no official parliamentary presence. The party cadres have been torching cell phones towers of Ncell knocking them out of service in Dang Deukhuri District. in addition to shutting down commercial traffic. Four strikes (banda) have been enforced by the party since its foundation, as of June 2016.  The party had initially called a peaceful protest to mark opposition to the Lipulekh Pass, a bilateral India-China deal that did not include Nepal, over territory that Nepal claims is theirs, but was ignored.

References

External links 
 Burned out cell phone towers

Communist parties in Nepal
Political parties established in 2014
2014 establishments in Nepal
Maoist organisations in Nepal
Rebel groups in Nepal